The Leinster Council is  a provincial council of the Gaelic Athletic Association sports of hurling, Gaelic football, camogie, rounders and handball in the province of Leinster. The Leinster Council has been partnered with the European County Board to help develop Gaelic Games in Europe. Leinster Council's main contribution to this goal is the provision of referees.

As of 2008, there were 834 clubs affiliated to the county boards of the Leinster Council.

County boards
 

Carlow
Dublin
Kildare
Kilkenny
Laois
Longford
Louth
Meath
Offaly
Westmeath
Wexford
Wicklow

Football

Provincial team
The Leinster provincial football team represents the province of Leinster in Gaelic football. The team competes in the Railway Cup.

Players

Players from the following county teams represent Leinster: Carlow, Dublin, Kildare, Kilkenny, Laois, Longford, Louth, Offaly, Westmeath, Wexford and Wicklow.

Competitions

Inter-county
Leinster Senior Football Championship
O'Byrne Cup
Leinster Junior Football Championship
Leinster Under-21 Football Championship
Leinster Minor Football Championship

Dublin heads the roll of honour in football, having won 54 Leinster Senior Football Championship titles as of 2015.

Club
Leinster Senior Club Football Championship
Leinster Intermediate Club Football Championship
Leinster Junior Club Football Championship
Leinster Minor Club Football Championship

Hurling

Provincial team
The Leinster provincial hurling team represents the province of Leinster in hurling. The team competes in the Railway Cup.

Players

Competitions

Inter-county
Leinster Senior Hurling Championship
Walsh Cup
Kehoe Cup
Leinster Intermediate Hurling Championship
Leinster Junior Hurling Championship
Leinster Under-21 Hurling Championship
Leinster Minor Hurling Championship

Kilkenny is the most successful county hurling team at senior level in the province, having won the Leinster Senior Hurling Championship on 74 occasions as of 2022.

Club
Leinster Senior Club Hurling Championship
Leinster Intermediate Club Hurling Championship
Leinster Junior Club Hurling Championship

Grades

Camogie

Gael Linn Cup
The Leinster camogie team won the premier representative competition in the women’s team field sport of camogie, the Gael Linn Cup on 26 occasions in 1956, 1957, 1958, 1959, 1960, 1962, 1965, 1968, 1969, 1970, 1971, 1972, 1978, 1979, 1981, 1983, 1984, 1985, 1986, 1987, 1988, 1989, 1991, 1993, 2006 and 2010.

Gael Linn Trophy
The Leinster provincial junior camogie team won the Gael Linn Trophy on seven occasions in 1976, 1982, 1984, 1986, 1999, 2001 and 2007.

County Honours

Governance

Past chairmen
Source:
 James Nowlan - 1900–1904
 John Fitzgerald - 1905–1908
 Dan McCarthy - 1909–1910, 1919–1921
 John J. Hogan - 1911–1918
 Patrick D. Breen - 1922–1923
 Bob O'Keeffe - 1924–1935
 Sean Robbins - 1936–1938
 Seamus Flood - 1939–1941
 Michael Kehoe - 1942–1944
 Fintan Brennan - 1945–1947
 Tom Walsh - 1948–1950
 Jack Fitzgerald - 1951–1953
 Dr. J. J. Stuart - 1954–1956
 Hugh Byrne - 1957–1959
 Brendan Breathnach - 1960–1962
 Liam Geraghty - 1963–1965
  - 1966–1968
 Jack Conroy - 1969–1971
 Tom Loftus - 1972–1974
 Jimmy Roche - 1975–1977
 Paddy Buggy Kilkenny - 1978–1980
 John Dowling Offaly - 1981–1983
 Peadar Kearney Louth - 1984–1986
 Jack Boothman Wicklow - 1987–1989
 Jimmy Gray Dublin - 1990–1992
 Albert Fallon - Longford 1993–1995
 Jim Berry - Wexford 1996–1998
 Seamus Aldridge Kildare - 1999–2001
 Nickey Brennan Kilkenny - 2002–2004
 Liam O'Neill Laois - 2005–2007
 Sheamus Howlin - Wexford 2008–2010
 Martin Skelly Longford - 2011–2013
 John Horan Dublin - 2014–2016
 Jim Bolger Carlow - 2017–2019
 Pat Teehan Offaly - 2020–present

References

External links
Leinster Council website

 
 
Gaelic games in Leinster
Provincial councils of the Gaelic Athletic Association
Gaelic